Magomed Magomedov may also refer to:

 Magomed Magomedov (fighter) (born 1991), Russian mixed martial artist
 Magomed Gadjievich Magomedov (1957–2013), Russian judge
 Magomed Magomedov (kickboxer) (born 1982), Russian kickboxer
 Magomed Magomedov (footballer, born 1987), Russian football player
 Magomed Magomedov (footballer, born 1997), Russian football player
 Magomed Magomedov (judoka born 1991), Russian judoka